The following is a list of computer conferences and other events focused on the development and usage of free and open-source software (FOSS).

General free-software events 

Some events with "Linux" in their name are in fact general-purpose free-software events, often because they began as Linux-only events before broadening their focus.

North, Central and South America
FLISOL – Latin American free software install fest held each year in all Latin America the same day, on the last Sunday of April
LibrePlanet – Organized annually by the Free Software Foundation in or around Boston, Massachusetts since 2006
LinuxFest Northwest, held in Bellingham, Washington in the spring since 2000
OLF Conference (formerly Ohio Linux Fest), held annually in Ohio since 2003
SouthEast LinuxFest, held annually in June since 2009.
Southern California Linux Expo (SCALE), held in Los Angeles each year since 2002
Seattle GNU/Linux conference (SeaGL), held each fall in Seattle since 2013

Europe
Berlin Buzzwords, held annually in June in Berlin, Germany, since 2010
Chemnitz Linux Days, held in Chemnitz, Germany since 1999
DevConf.cz, held annually in Brno, Czech Republic since 2009
FOSS Backstage, held annually in February in Berlin, Germany, since 2018
Fosscomm, held annually in a different Greek city since 2008
FOSDEM, held in Brussels, Belgium every February since 2001
FrOSCon, held in Sankt Augustin (near Bonn), Germany since 2006
Linux Day, held in Italy since 2001
Linux Vacation / Eastern Europe, held in Belarus every summer since 2005
openSUSE Conference, held annually at a location in Europe since 2010
OpenFest, held annually in Sofia, Bulgaria, every November since 2003

Asia and Australia
COSCUP, held annually in Taiwan since 2006
FOSSASIA Summit, held annually since 2009, normally in the Singapore hub.
IndiaFOSS, first held in 2020 as IndiaOS, then held in July 2022 in Bangalore.
linux.conf.au, held in Australia or New Zealand in the (Southern Hemisphere) summer since 1999
openSUSE Asia Summit, held annually at a location in Asia since 2014

Africa
 linuxconf.co.za, held in South Africa since 2018

International
Open Source Summit, known before 2017 as "LinuxCon", held several times each year in various continents since 2009
Software Freedom Day, international observance since 2004
FOSS4G (Free and Open Source Software for Geospatial), since 2006. Held once a year in various continents. Organized by OSGeo.

Defunct 
Africa Source, held in 2004 and 2006
Asia Source, held in 2005, 2007 and 2009
 August Penguin, held annually in Israel from 2004 to 2018
FOSSAP, held in 2004 and 2005
FOSS.IN, first known as "Linux Bangalore", held from 2001 to 2012
Fórum Internacional Software Livre (FISL) – International Free Software Forum, held each year in Porto Alegre, Brazil (with 7000+ participants) from 2000 to 2018
Free Software and Open Source Symposium (FSOSS), held at Seneca College, Toronto each October from 2001 to 2018
FSCONS, held every autumn in Gothenburg, Sweden from 2007 to 2019
GOSCON, held annually in the United States from 2005 to 2011
Libre Software Meeting, French name "Rencontres mondiales du logiciel libre", held every July in France or surrounding countries from 2000 to 2018
Linux Bier Wanderung, informal event held in a different European country every summer from 1999 to 2019
OggCamp, a BarCamp-style conference held annually in the United Kingdom from 2009 to 2019
Ontario Linux Fest, held in Toronto, Ontario in the autumn from 2007 to 2009
Open Source Day, conference held annually in Warsaw, Poland from 2008 to 2019
Open Source Developers' Conference (OSDC), held annually in various countries from 2004 to 2015
, a trade show and conference with 10,000 visitors held every year in Paris from 1999 to 2014
O'Reilly Open Source Convention (OSCON), held each summer in the US from 1999 to 2019.
 ÖzgürKon, online conference held in 2020 and 2021
LinuxWorld Conference and Expo, briefly also known as "OpenSource World", from 1998 to 2009
Wizards of OS, held in Berlin every two years from 1999 to 2006
LinuxTag, held in Germany every summer from 1996 to 2014

Events for specific free software

Operating systems
DebConf – conference for the Debian operating system, held annually since 2000
Linux Kernel Developers Summit, annual conference since 2001
ROSCon, annual conference about ROS since 2012

Programming languages
PyCon – conference for the Python programming language, held several times a year in different locations since 2003
RubyConf – conference for the Ruby programming language, held once a year in different locations since 2002
Yet Another Perl Conference – conference for the Perl programming language, held several times a year since 1999
ZendCon & OpenEnterprise – PHP and open source conference

Other
Akademy – conference for the KDE desktop environment, held annually in Europe since 1997
ApacheCon – conference for the Apache HTTP Server, held once or twice each year since 2000
DjangoCon – conference for the Django web framework, held twice a year (once in Europe and once in the U.S.) since 2008
DrupalCon – conference for the Drupal content management framework, held twice a year (once in Europe and once in North America) since 2007
GNOME Users And Developers European Conference – conference for the GNOME desktop environment, held annually in Europe since 2000
GNUHealthCon – conference for the GNU Health hospital management and digital health ecosystem, held annually since 2010
Libre Graphics Meeting, held each year in May in Europe or Canada since 2006
LibreOffice Conference, conference for LibreOffice FOSS office suite, held each year since 2011
Spinnaker Summit – summit for the Spinnaker continuous delivery software, held annually in the United States since 2017
WordCamp – event for the WordPress content management system, held frequently around the world since 2007
X.Org Developers' Conference (XDC) and X Developers' Summit (XDS), annual events since 2005 organized by X.Org Foundation

Defunct
BeGeistert – conference for the Haiku operating system, held annually in Europe from 2006 to 2016 (originally a BeOS conference, from 1998 to 2005)
Desktop Developers' Conference, held from 2004 to 2006
Desktop Linux Summit, held in San Diego, California from 2003 to 2006
GCC Summit, held in Ottawa, Ontario, Canada from 2003 to 2010
Gelato ICE, held each year in the US or Italy by the Gelato Federation from 2001 to 2007
Joomla World Conference – event for the Joomla content management system, held frequently around the from 2011 to 2019
Linux Kongress, held in Germany in the autumn from 1994 to 2010
Linux Symposium, held in Canada in the summer from 1999 to 2014
Ubuntu Developer Summit, held twice a year (timed with respect to Ubuntu releases), alternating between Europe and North America, from 2004 to 2015

References

External links
LWN.net Community Calendar – lists upcoming Linux and free/open source software conferences
Linux Magazin events calendar – continuously updated list of Linux and Open Source conferences
// foss.events – upcoming and past Free and Open Source Software events in Europe
FOSS Events in Europe

Free software